The men's lightweight was a weightlifting event held as part of the Weightlifting at the 1920 Summer Olympics programme. 1920 was the first time weightlifting was divided into weight categories. Lightweight was the second lightest category, including weightlifters weighing up to 67.5 kilograms. A total of 12 weightlifters from 10 nations competed in the event, which was held on 29 August 1920.

Results

References

Sources
 
 

Weightlifting at the 1920 Summer Olympics